Zane David Memeger (born November 6, 1964) is an American attorney who served as the United States Attorney for the Eastern District of Pennsylvania from 2010 to 2016.

Education 
Memeger earned a Bachelor of Science from James Madison University in 1986, and a Juris Doctor from the University of Virginia School of Law in 1991.

Career 
Before his appointment as United States Attorney, Memeger was a litigator at Morgan, Lewis & Bockius, first from 1991 to 1995. Memeger resigned from the firm to serve as Assistant United States attorney in the Eastern District of Pennsylvania from 1995 to 2006. Memger then returned to Morgan, Lewis & Bockius as a partner from 2006 to 2010, focusing on white collar criminal defense, corporate investigations, and healthcare fraud investigations.

Personal life 
Memeger was born in Yonkers, New York and grew up in Wilmington, Delaware. He now lives in Philadelphia.

References

1964 births
Living people
United States Attorneys for the Eastern District of Pennsylvania
Pennsylvania Democrats
James Madison University alumni
University of Virginia School of Law alumni
African-American lawyers
20th-century American lawyers
21st-century American lawyers
20th-century African-American people
21st-century African-American people